Giardia ( or ) is a genus of anaerobic flagellated protozoan parasites of the phylum Metamonada that colonise and reproduce in the small intestines of several vertebrates, causing the disease giardiasis. Their life cycle alternates between a swimming trophozoite and an infective, resistant cyst. Giardia were first described by the Dutch microscopist Antonie van Leeuwenhoek in 1681. The genus is named after French zoologist Alfred Mathieu Giard.

Characteristics
Like other diplomonads, Giardia have two nuclei, each with four associated flagella, and were thought to lack both mitochondria and Golgi apparatuses.  However, they are now known to possess a complex endomembrane system as well as mitochondrial remnants, called mitosomes, through mitochondrial reduction.

  The mitosomes are not used in ATP synthesis the way mitochondria are, but are involved in the maturation of iron-sulfur proteins.  The synapomorphies of genus Giardia include cells with duplicate organelles, absence of cytostomes, and ventral adhesive disc.

Systematics
About 40 species have been described from different animals, but many of them are probably synonyms. Currently, five to six morphologically distinct species are recognised. Giardia lamblia (=G. intestinalis, =G. duodenalis) infect humans and other mammals, G. muris is found from other mammals, G. ardeae and G. psittaci from birds, G. agilis from amphibians and G. microti from voles. Other described (but not certainly valid), species include:

Giardia ardeae
Giardia beckeri
Giardia beltrani
Giardia botauri
Giardia bovis
Giardia bradypi
Giardia canis
Giardia caprae
Giardia cati
Giardia caviae
Giardia chinchillae
Giardia dasi
Giardia equii
Giardia floridae
Giardia hegneri
Giardia herodiadis
Giardia hyderabadensis
Giardia irarae
Giardia marginalis
Giardia melospizae
Giardia nycticori
Giardia ondatrae
Giardia otomyis
Giardia pitymysi
Giardia pseudoardeae
Giardia psittaci
Giardia recurvirostrae
Giardia sanguinis
Giardia serpentis
Giardia simoni
Giardia sturnellae
Giardia suricatae
Giardia tucani
Giardia varani 
Giardia viscaciae
Giardia wenyoni

Many different species of Giardia exist, so to differentiate between species, very specific PCR (Polymerase Chain Reactions) have been developed to detect specific Giardia spp. Gene probe-based detection is also used to differentiate between species of Giardia. A more common and less time-consuming means of identifying different species of Giardia includes microscopy and immunofluorescence techniques.

Genetic and biochemical studies have revealed the heterogeneity of Giardia lamblia, which contains probably at least eight lineages or cryptic species.

Phylogeny 
The phylogeny of Giardia is unclear, but two main theories exist. Firstly, Giardia may be primitive extremely eukaryotes that branched off early from other members of their group. This theory is supported by several features: their lack of complete mitochondria (see Characteristics) and other organelles, their primitive metabolic pathways, and their position on a phylogenetic tree. However, many of these differences have been refuted in recent years, and many researchers are supporting a second theory: that Giardia are highly evolved parasites, which have lost ancestral characteristics.

Genome
A Giardia isolate (WB) was the first diplomonad to have its genome sequenced. Its 11.7 million basepair genome is compact in structure and content with simplified basic cellular machineries and metabolism. Currently the genomes of several other Giardia isolates and diplomonads (the fish pathogens Spironucleus vortens and S. salmonicida) are being sequenced.

A second isolate (the B assemblage) from humans has been sequenced along with a species from a pig (the E assemblage). There are ~5000 genes in the genome. The E assemblage is more closely related to the A assemblage than is the B. A number of chromosomal rearrangements are present.

Infection

Giardia lives in the intestines of infected humans or other animals, individuals of which become infected by ingesting or coming into contact with contaminated foods, soil, or water tainted by the feces of an infected carrier.

The symptoms of Giardia, which may begin to appear 2 days after infection, can include mild to violent diarrhoea, excess gas, stomach or abdominal cramps, upset stomach, and nausea.  Resulting dehydration and nutritional loss may need immediate treatment.  A typical infection can be slight, resolve without treatment, and last between 2–6 weeks, although it can sometimes last longer and/or be more severe. Coexistence with the parasite is possible (symptoms fade), but an infected individual can remain a carrier and transmit it to others.  Medication containing tinidazole or metronidazole decreases symptoms and time to resolution. Albendazole is also used, and has an anthelmintic (anti-worm) property as well, ideal for certain compounded issues when a general vermicidal agent is preferred.
Giardia causes a disease called giardiasis, which causes the villi of the small intestine to atrophy and flatten, resulting in malabsorption in the intestine. Lactose intolerance can persist after the eradication of Giardia from the digestive tract.

Prevalence
As of 2008 cysts are commonly detected in surface water in Russia. Water treatment plants in Moscow are occasionally contaminated with the parasites and in many cities in Russia – including Saint Petersburg – the reputation of municipal water is so bad that residents preemptively boil drinking water.

See also
List of parasites (human)

References

External links

Metamonads
Excavata genera
1681 in science

pt:Giárdia